Harry Marks may refer to:
 Harry Marks (journalist), British politician and journalist
 Harry Marks (broadcast designer), British-American broadcast designer and co-founder of the TED Conference
 Harry Marks (architect), architect in Toowoomba, Queensland, Australia